Yamasinghe Bandara (baptised as Dom Filipe) was a nephew of Karaliyadde Bandara. He helped the Portuguese take control of Kandy.

See also
 History of Sri Lanka

References

External links
 Kingdom of Kandy - Mahanuwara
 Kings & Rulers of Sri Lanka
 Codrington's Short History of Ceylon

Portuguese colonisation in Asia
Kandyan period